Helicometrinae is a subfamily of trematodes in the family Opecoelidae.

Genera
 Helicometra Odhner, 1902
 Helicometrina Linton, 1910
 Neohelicometra Siddiqi & Cable, 1960

References

Opecoelidae